National Law School of India University (NLSIU), or simply National Law School (NLS), is a public law school and a National Law University located in Bangalore. Considered the best law school in India, it has topped all indices relating to law schools.

Laid foundation by then Chief Justice Y. V. Chandrachud, National Law School was the first National Law University (NLU) to be established in India as well as one of the first in the country to offer the five-year integrated undergraduate law degree. 

National Law School of India was established by the eponymous Act of 1986 passed by the Karnataka Legislative Assembly. The statute states that the Visitor of the school shall be the Chief Justice of India, who is the de facto Chancellor. The day-to-day management and administration of the university is undertaken by the Vice-Chancellor. The school was the brainchild of N. R. Madhava Menon who also went on to establish other NLUs in the country as part of legal education reforms.

Spread over 23 acres of campus, it houses country's largest law library and hosts some of the country's largest competitions and events, two of which are NLS Debate and Strawberry Fields. The school is known for its highly competitive admissions which are screened through the Common Law Admission Test and National Law School Admission Test (NLSAT). It has a yearly intake of 568 students across its programmes.

National Law School is the only Indian institute to have won Philip C. Jessup International Law Moot Court Competition, doing so in 1999 and 2013. 25 of its alumnis have been Rhodes scholars. One of its flagship student-run publications, National Law School of India Review has been cited by the Supreme Court of India thrice.

Sudhir Krishnaswamy, an alumnus, is the sixth and the current Vice Chancellor.

History 
The founding of the National Law School was a culmination of over two decades of effort by a legal team including former Chief Justice Mohammad Hidayatullah, Ram Jethmalani and Upendra Baxi. Efforts were being made especially through the Legal Education Committee of the Bar Council of India to establish a university on the lines of Harvard Law School. Subsequently, the Bar Council of India Trust and the Government of Karnataka reached an agreement to found the first National Law University in Bangalore. As such, in 1986, National Law University of India was established under the leadership of its founder, then Vice-Chancellor N. R. Madhava Menon.

Menon was keen on ensuring that the teaching at the university was not conducted in the traditional lecture format, which was then popular across Indian law colleges. As such, he introduced the case method, which originated at the Harvard Law School in the early 1900s. He also introduced the concept of group teaching, where more than one professor would conduct classes, with the professors taking contradictory positions and arguing the various points of law.

The first batch of law students joined the school's undergraduate programme on 1 July 1988. Classes commenced before the school's buildings had been fully constructed; thus, the school actually began instruction at the premises of the Central College of Bangalore University and continued therein until November 1991. The school then formally moved to its present-day location in the Nagarbhavi suburb.

Administration 
Section 7 of The National Law School of India Act, 1986 names the Chief Justice of India as the Visitor of the school. This position is of the de facto Chancellor. They have been given with wide-range of powers to cause inspection into the functions of the school.

The Vice-Chancellor of the school is the chief executive officer of the university, conducting day-to-day operations of the school. The first Vice Chancellor was the founder N. R. Madhava Menon. The school has since had five more Vice-Chancellors, namely N. L. Mitra, A. Jayagovind, G. Mohan Gopal, R. Venkata Rao, and Sudhir Krishnaswamy, who took over in 2019.

Authorities of the school 
Section 8 of act establishes the General Council, the Executive Council, the Academic Council, and the Finance Council; all four to facilitate the administration of the school. The Councils consist of heavyweight individuals such as the Chief Justice of India and other of High courts of India, Chairman of the Bar Council of India, judges of the Supreme Court of India, Advocate general of Karnataka, secretaries and ministers of the Government of Karnataka and other 'eminent persons' in the field of law.

Admissions 
Admissions to 5-year undergraduate programme are based on the Common Law Admission Test-undergraduate (CLAT-UG). For the 2023-28 session of the undergraduate CLAT, a total of 56,472 students contested for 2644 seats out of which 240 were of NLSIU. 

In 2020, NLSIU withdrew from the CLAT and announced it would be holding its own entrance examination called the National Law Aptitude Test (NLAT) which was later turned down by the Supreme Court of India.

CLAT-PG is how candidates of the Master of Laws (LL.M) are screened, whereas for the candidates of 3-year LL.B., Master’s Programme in Public Policy (MPP), and Doctor of Philosophy (Ph.D.), the National Law School Admission Tests (NLSAT) are conducted.

In June 2021, NLSIU announced a major expansion plan. The plan entails increasing the number of students enrolled on campus exponentially  from 660 in 2021 to 2,200 in 2028. The increase in the number of students will mainly be as a result of implementing caste-based reservation (required by law) and establishing a three-year LLB course.

Academics

Undergraduate 
NLSIU offers school graduates its flagship five-year integrated B.A./LL.B. which qualifies the student to sit for the bar to practice law in India.

The undergraduate B.A./LL.B. curriculum at the school consists of a mix of social science and legal subjects. In the first two years, the law student attends courses on history, political science, sociology and economics alongside standard legal subjects, such as torts, contracts and constitutional law. In the latter three years, legal subjects dominate the curriculum. 

In 2017, NLSIU radically overhauled its academic curriculum, allowing students to choose a greater number of their upper-year courses. The aim of the change was to bring NLSIU in line with international best-practices allowing students to explore areas of their interest to a greater degree. This overhaul was also aimed at increasing the number of courses offered by industry practitioners by allowing for flexible evaluation patterns.

Postgraduate 
NLSIU launched a three-year standard LLB programme in 2022, making it the first NLU to do so.

The school offers both coursework and research degrees at the postgraduate level. The LL.M. is a one-year coursework degree. The PhDs are research degrees.

NLSIU offers a two-year residential Master's Programme in Public Policy (MPP) programme, organised in six trimesters. In 2016 the UGC had asked NLSIU to change the name of MPP to Master of Arts (MA) in Public Policy.

In addition to the above full-time programmes, the school's Professional and Continuing Education (PACE) offers several part-time distance learning programmes, including a master's degree in Business Law (MBL) and Postgraduate Diploma programmes in various fields.

Rankings

	
National Law School of India is widely considered the best law school of India, ranking number one in all indices related to the law education. The National Institutional Ranking Framework (NIRF) ranked the institute first in its law ranking of 2022 as did India Today "India's Best Colleges 2022: Law" and Outlook Indias "Top 13 Government Law Institutes In India" of 2022.

Melgiri Memorial National Law Library 
The Narayan Rao Melgiri Memorial National Law Library at the school is the largest law library in the country, housing a collection of over 50,000 books and 20,000 journals covering a wide range of general and special subjects, comprising textbooks, reference books, back volumes of journals and reports, apart from current legal periodicals. It is named after Narayan Rao Melgiri, who was a distinguished lawyer in Gadag. The Melgiri Library was inaugurated by Chief Justice of India Ramesh Chandra Lahoti in 2005. The library was built through contributions from the University Grants Commission (India) and Sudha Murthy, chairperson of the Infosys Foundation and also the grand-daughter of Melgiri.

UNHCR Chair on Refugee Laws 
In 1995, the first UNHCR Chair for Refugee Law was inaugurated at NLSIU. It serves as the Asian Centre for Refugee Law. N. Subramanya worked on issues pertaining to refugees during his tenure as researcher under the UNHCR Chair and in 2004 two of his books about refugees were published.

Student activities

The Student Bar Association
The Student Bar Association (SBA) is the umbrella body that coordinates all student activities; all students are de facto members of the SBA. The SBA has created various Activity-Based Committees (ABCs) which are in charge of specific student activities.

NLSIU has a total of twelve ABCs which coordinate the activities of the Student Bar Association (SBA). These committees are re-constituted every year. The Co-ordination Council consists of the Convenors/Joint Convenors of the ABCs. This Council is responsible for ensuring that the various ABCs function coherently. A wide range of internal as well as inter-institutional activities throughout the academic year are organised by the ABCs and the Co-ordination Council. These include Spiritus (Sports Festival), Strawberry Fields (Music Festival), the NLS-Trilegal International Arbitration Moot, the NLS Negotiation and Mediation Competition and Admit One (Theater Festival). Students are also responsible for the publication of Quirk, an online magazine at NLSIU, which seeks to provide space to engage in a meaningful and mature dialogue.

Competitive debating
NLSIU plays an active role in promoting parliamentary debate in India. The school regularly participates in many international competitions and is currently the highest-ranking Indian team in the World rankings. NLSIU reached the ESL Finals in 2002 and in 2007 at the World Universities Debating Championship. It also recently won the 15th All Asian Debating Championships held in Dhaka in 2008. Three out of the four semi-finalist teams, and six of the top ten speakers, were from NLSIU. Another boost for the Parliamentary Debate movement in NLSIU came in the form of the Cambridge University Debate Competition 2009, where the NLSIU team became the first South Asian team to "make the break" and reach the second round of the competition. NLSIU teams have also performed extremely well in the inaugural Asians BP Tournament held in Chulalongkorn University, with all three of its teams reaching the semi finals of the tournament, and two out of the top ten speakers (and four in the top 20). Since then, NLS has reached the Semi-finals of the United Asian Debating Championships held at Assumption University, Bangkok, in 2010. The NLSIU team of Anil Sebastian Pulickel and Aniruddha Basu have also been finalists at ABP. NLSIU speakers are consistently ranked at the top of parliamentary debates at the national and international level.

NLSIU also hosts South Asia's biggest Parliamentary Debate Competition, the National Law School Debate. The inaugural edition of the NLS Debate was held in 2002. The competition brings together participants from across South Asia. In 2011, NLSIU's Literary and Debating Society launched two new initiatives – the NLS Union Debate and the NLS Debate Junior. Christ Junior College is also organising a parliamentary debate, in a tie-up with NLS.

Moot court competitions
NLSIU is the only law school in South Asia to have won the Philip C. Jessup International Law Moot Court Competition twice, in 1999 and 2013 and to reach its finals in 2018. NLSIU has won the Monroe E. Price Media Law Moot Court Competition at the University of Oxford in 2021. NLSIU has also won the Manfred Lachs Space Law Moot Court competition in 2009, 2012 and most recently in 2017.

Student Exchange Programs 
Students from the 5th year of the undergraduate course can take the opportunity to spend a semester abroad as part of the student exchange program run by the NLSIU. The University has MoUs for the same with over 30 universities all across the world, including the Georgetown University Law Center, National University of Singapore and the Sciences Po. Students from a number of these universities also visit NLSIU on short-term and long-term exchange programs.

Graduate Outcomes 
Students graduating from the school pursue a diverse range of careers. A number of students opt to join corporate or other law firms. These may also include roles as business analysts in consultancy firms. Several students enter litigation careers, with a number of alumni having distinguished themselves in various courts across the country. NLSIU has produced 25 Rhodes Scholars.

The founder Menon had outlined two objectives of the school and its replicas; first being to "strengthen the trial courts with competent judges at the grass roots" and the next being "to act as a pace setter in legal education reforms". He conceded in 2017 that he sees the former objective not being achieved. He believed this is because of the absorption of the school's talent by the corporate sector rather than by the grassroot litigation.

Notable people

Alumni 

 Shamnad Basheer, founder, SpicyIP Blog and the IDIA Trust.
 G. C. Bharuka, Acting Chief Justice, Karnataka High Court
 Gautam Bhatia, lawyer
 Ananda Mohan Bhattarai, a Justice of Supreme Court of Nepal
 Harpreet Singh Giani, litigator.
 Menaka Guruswamy and Arundhati Katju, a homosexual couple known for their involvement in decriminalisation of homosexuality. Jointly named as one of Times 100 Most Influential Persons 2019.
 Padmapriya Janakiraman, Indian Actress
 Kalyan Chakravarthy Kankanala, Advisory Board member of the Centre for Excellence in IP and Standards at National Law School of India University.
 Prabha Kotiswaran, Professor of King's College London
 Shankar Krishnamurthy, Anchor, Lawyer
 Sudhir Krishnaswamy, Vice-Chancellor of NLSIU
 Aparna Kumar, IPS, UP Cadre, Awarded with the Tenzing Norgay National Adventure Award in 2018
 K. Vijay Kumar IPS, Director General Of Police
 R Sri Kumar, Central Vigilance Commissioner
 Lawrence Liang, Professor of Ambedkar University Delhi
 Hari Prasad Phuyal, a Justice of Supreme Court of Nepal
 Lavanya Rajamani, Indian Lawyer
 Srikrishna Deva Rao, Vice Chancellor of National Law University Delhi
 Krishna Udayasankar, Writer
 Rose Varghese, former Vice Chancellor of National University of Advanced Legal Studies, Kochi

Faculty 

 Albertina Almeida, a lawyer and human rights activist
 T. R. Andhyarujina, Senior advocate at the Supreme Court of India
 S. Rajendra Babu, 34th Chief Justice of India
 Ajay Gudavarthy, a political theorist, analyst and columnist in India
 Shashikala Gurpur, Indian author and professor
 Alangar Jayagovind, Professor of International Trade Law, and also a former Vice Chancellor.
 Altamas Kabir, 39th Chief Justice of India
 Subramanya Nagarajarao, author and researcher specialised in refugees
 Issa G. Shivji, a Tanzanian author and academic
 V. Vijayakumar, Vice Chancellor of National Law Institute University, Bhopal

Gallery

Publications
There are numerous journals published by the students and faculty at NLSIU. Their National Law School of India Review has been cited by the Supreme Court of India in two notable judgments including the Right to Privacy verdict, which is the only student-run law journal of the already few Indian law journals to have been cited by the Supreme Court of India. 

These are the journals published by the school:

 National Law School Journal
 National Law School of India Review
 NLS Business Law Review
 Socio-Legal Review
 Journal on Environmental Law Policy and Development (JELPD)
 Journal of Law and Public Policy (JLPP)
 International Journal on Consumer law and Practice 
 Indian Journal of Law and Technology
 Indian Journal of International Economic Law (IJIEL)

See also
Strawberry Fields (Indian festival)
NLS Debate
Legal education in India
List of law schools in India
Public Policy Schools

Notes

References

External links

 
 
 
 
 

Law schools in Karnataka
National Law Universities
National Law School of India University
1987 establishments in Karnataka
Educational institutions established in 1987